Jill Matthews (born February 3, 1964) is an American former professional boxer who competed from 1995 to 1999. She held the IWBF light flyweight title in 1998 and challenged for the WIBF light flyweight title in 1999.

Biography

Jill Matthews didn't take up boxing until she was 31 and then won the NY Golden Gloves. A year later Matthews became a world champion.

Professional boxing record

References

External links 
 

1964 births
Living people
Jewish boxers
American women boxers
Boxers from New York (state)
World light-flyweight boxing champions
Light-flyweight boxers
Flyweight boxers
21st-century American women